The Vale Formation is a geologic formation in Texas. It preserves fossils dating back to the Permian period. Diplocaulus recurvatus is one of the creatures discovered there.

See also

 List of fossiliferous stratigraphic units in Texas
 Paleontology in Texas

References
 

Permian geology of Texas